Lothrop Magnet Center is a public elementary school located at 3300 North 22nd Street in the Kountze Place neighborhood of North Omaha, Nebraska, United States. As a magnet school it focuses on the topics of science, Spanish and technology. The school currently serves 380 students in prekindergarten through fourth grade.

The school was one of Omaha's "black schools."

In 1998 the school was protested by a Christian organization for offering professional development courses on homosexuality awareness after offensive slang was repeatedly heard throughout the school. The group later offered a public apology.

In 2007 the school was locked down after gunshots were fired in the surrounding neighborhood.

Present demographics
In the 2007-08 school year African American students accounted for 84.7% of the total population of Lothrop. White students made up 8.1% and Hispanics accounted for 5.1% of the student population. The mobility rate was 22.2% and the attendance rate was 93.6%. Free and reduced lunch recipients accounted for 78.8% of the student population. It is a Title I school with a 66.68% poverty rate.

See also
 Education in North Omaha, Nebraska
 List of public schools in Omaha, Nebraska

References

External links
 Official website
 "Lothrop School: Lottie Underhill", Nebraska Ancestree. 10.(1) Summer 1987. 14-18.

Elementary schools in Omaha, Nebraska
Schools in North Omaha, Nebraska
Historically segregated African-American schools in Nebraska
Educational institutions in the United States with year of establishment missing
Public elementary schools in Nebraska
Magnet schools in Nebraska